Robotkid is the alias of Josh Randall, an electronic dance musician, video artist, and video game developer from Cambridge, Massachusetts. Along with PK, he was part of the mid-1990s synthcore band Institute of Technology. He is the former Creative Director at Harmonix Music Systems, the video game studio responsible for the Karaoke Revolution, Guitar Hero, and Rock Band series. Prior to Harmonix, Randall worked for Looking Glass Studios. Like Freezepop, whose Kasson Crooker also works for Harmonix, Robotkid's music has made appearances on the studio's game releases.

Discography

Robotkid 
 You Shriek – "Grim" (1994, Deaktiv) (song: "Grim" (Reality remix))
 Freezepop – Fashion Impression Function (2001, Archenemy) (song: "Science Genius Girl" (Robotkid's Lameboy mix))
 Frequency video game (2001, Harmonix) (song: "End of Your World" by Robotkid and Inter:sekt)

Institute of Technology 
 The Return of the Bass EP (1994, self-released)
 "Smart Bomb" (split 7-inch with Sirensong) (1994, Breakfast)
 Hellscape compilation (1995, Furnace) (songs: "Justfiable Homiside" and "Dub B-Yond All Computation")
 Accidents Have No Holidays compilation (1995, Povertech) (song: "Excerpt from Spacejam 2000")
 Operation Beatbox compilation (1996, Re-Constriction) (song: "King of Rock")
 Boston Elektro 101 compilation (1996, Sinless) (song: "Mizerable")
 TV Terror compilation (1997, Re-Constriction) (song: "Mary Tyler Moore")
 Killing Floor – "Come Together" CD single (1997, Re-Constriction) (song: "Tear It All Away" (Institute of Technology remix))
 Digital Wings 1 compilation (1997, Cyberden) (song: "Smartbeets")

Ludography

References

External links 
Robotkid.com featuring downloadable tracks from both his solo and IT projects
Josh Randall at MobyGames
"Smartbomb", "On the Download", Boston Phoenix, July 22, 2005
Remix of Freezepop's "Science Genius Girl"
Josh Randall bio from Cybersonica '06 program booklet
"Games People Play", Boston Phoenix, May 6, 2005
Tour of Randall's desk at Harmonix (photos and interview)

American electro musicians
American video game directors
American video game producers
Creative directors
Living people
Year of birth missing (living people)